The Löffelhorn is a mountain of the Bernese Alps, located on the border between the Swiss cantons of Bern and Valais. It is part of the Aargrat, a range east of the Oberaarhorn that separates the valley of the Oberaar Glacier from the valley of Goms.

References

External links
 Löffelhorn on Hikr

Bernese Alps
Mountains of the Alps
Alpine three-thousanders
Mountains of Switzerland
Mountains of the canton of Bern
Mountains of Valais
Bern–Valais border